This is a list of presidents of Shimer College, from 1853 to the present.

List
 A "–" indicates that the individual served as interim or acting president.

Works cited

References

Lists of people by university or college in Illinois
Lists of university and college leaders